Donald Rowland Knowles OBE was a Caribbean Anglican bishop in the 20th century.

Knowles was born on Long Island in the Bahamas on 14 July 1898 and educated at Hatfield College, Durham and ordained in 1923. He began his career as a Curate on Andros Island after which he was Priest in Charge on Acklins Island then Rector of St Matthew's Nassau. Later he was Archdeacon of The Bahamas and in 1953 he was ordained to the episcopate as Bishop of Antigua, a post he held for 16 years. He died on 26 September 1977.

References

1898 births
Alumni of Hatfield College, Durham
Archdeacons of the Bahamas
20th-century Anglican bishops in the Caribbean
Anglican bishops of Antigua
Officers of the Order of the British Empire
1977 deaths
Bahamian bishops
People from Andros, Bahamas
People from Long Island, Bahamas